Bartosz Bosacki (born 20 December 1975) is a former Polish footballer who played as a defender.

International career
On 22 May 2006, Paweł Janas called up Bosacki for the 2006 World Cup as a replacement for Damian Gorawski, after the latter failed medical tests upon being diagnosed with severe asthma. Bosacki scored both goals in Poland's group-stage 2–1 win against Costa Rica on 20 June 2006, which were in fact the only goals scored by the Polish national team during the games. He has been capped 20 times for Poland and scored two goals.

International goals

References

External links
 
 

1975 births
Living people
Footballers from Poznań
Association football defenders
Polish footballers
Lech Poznań players
Amica Wronki players
1. FC Nürnberg players
Bundesliga players
2006 FIFA World Cup players
Poland international footballers
Polish expatriate footballers
Ekstraklasa players